The 1913 Virginia gubernatorial election was held on November 4, 1913 to elect the governor of Virginia. Henry Carter Stuart won in a landslide, as the Republicans failed to nominate a candidate for governor.

Results

References

1913
Virginia
gubernatorial
November 1913 events